This is an incomplete list of ghost towns in Oklahoma, United States of America, including abandoned sites.

Classification
Ghost towns can include sites in various states of disrepair and abandonment.  Some sites no longer have any trace of civilization and have reverted to pasture land or empty fields.  Other sites are unpopulated but still have standing buildings.  Some sites may even have a sizable, though small population, but there are far fewer citizens than in its grander historic past.

Barren site
 Sites no longer in existence
 Sites that have been destroyed
 Covered with water
 Reverted to pasture
 May have a few difficult to find foundations/footings at most

Neglected site
 Only rubble left
 Roofless building ruins
 Buildings or houses still standing, but majority are roofless

Abandoned site

 Building or houses still standing
 Buildings and houses all abandoned
 No population, except caretaker
 Site no longer in existence except for one or two buildings, for example old church, grocery store

Many of these communities played important roles in the history, settlement, and growth of the state. Platted town sites organized by railroads, speculators, or the government during the opening of Oklahoma, many times, failed to prosper after initial settlement. Other communities grew up around rural schools, post offices, or general stores, and faded away when the attracting facilities closed. Several important Indian settlements developed around frontier forts, trading posts, Indian agencies, or where natural resources attracted permanent dwellings and dissolved when the Indian lands were opened. Oil boom towns also sometimes attracted thousands of people but disappeared when the boom ended. Abandoned sites in Oklahoma are almost always located on private, state, tribal, or federal land, and trespassing laws apply.

Semi abandoned site
 Building or houses still standing
 Buildings and houses largely abandoned
 few residents
 many abandoned buildings
 Small population

Historic community
 Building or houses still standing
 Still a busy community
 Smaller than its boom years
 Population has decreased dramatically, to one fifth or less.

Ghost towns

See also
History of Oklahoma
List of cities in Oklahoma
List of towns in Oklahoma
List of unincorporated communities in Oklahoma
List of Census Designated Places in Oklahoma

References

Further reading
 Berry, Shelley, Small Towns, Ghost Memories of Oklahoma: A Photographic Narrative of Hamlets and Villages Throughout Oklahoma's Seventy-seven Counties (Virginia Beach, Va.: Donning Company Publishers, 2004). 
 Blake Gumprecht, "A Saloon On Every Corner: Whiskey Towns of Oklahoma Territory, 1889-1907," The Chronicles of Oklahoma 74 (Summer 1996). 
 Carson, Mary.  Guide to Treasure in Oklahoma Volume 1.  144.

 "Ghost Towns," Vertical File, Research Division, Oklahoma Historical Society, Oklahoma City.

External links
View Ghost Towns in Google Maps
 Map of Ghost Towns in Oklahoma
Oklahoma Ghost Towns
 Encyclopedia of Oklahoma History and Culture - Ghost Towns
 Abandoned Oklahoma

Oklahoma
 
Ghost towns
Ghost towns in Oklahoma